Chase Brown (born March 21, 2000) is a Canadian gridiron football running back. He played one season with Western Michigan before transferring to Illinois in 2019. Brown won the 2022 Jon Cornish Trophy as the top Canadian in college football after rushing for over 1,600 yards with 10 touchdowns. He is the identical twin brother of Sydney Brown.

Early life and high school career
Brown was born in 2000 and raised in London, Ontario, Canada. He relocated from Canada to Florida as a junior in high school and attended Saint Stephen's Episcopal School in Bradenton, Florida. During the 2016 and 2017 seasons, he was teammates with his identical twin brother, Sydney Brown, who played at the safety position. He set the school's career rushing record, but received a modest three-star rating by 247Sports.

College football

Western Michigan
In October 2017, Brown verbally committed to play college football at Western Michigan University. As a freshman, he played for the 2018 Western Michigan Broncos football team and rushed for 352 yards on 71 carries for an average of five yards per carry. He also returned 12 kickoffs for 227 yards. In early 2019, Western Michigan's two freshmen stars, Brown and freshman receiver Jayden Reed, entered the NCAA transfer portal.

Illinois
Brown transferred to Illinois in 2019, joining his identical twin brother, Sydney, a defensive back for the Illini. With both brothers playing at Illinois, Sydney noted: "This is what we dreamt about as kids. Having him come here has been like having a piece of home here in Illinois"

Brown's application for immediate eligibility was initially denied, but granted on appeal in mid-October 2019. After appearing in four games during the 2019 season, he redshirted and retained the year of eligibility. He tallied 18 rushing yards on three carries during the 2019 season.

During the COVID shutdown, Brown and his twin brother Sydney returned to Canada and stayed with their grandmother, converting the garage into a gym. Brown returned to Illinois in the fall and appeared in all eight games for the Illini. On November 14, 2020, he had his first 100-yard game against Rutgers, totaling 134 rushing yards. One week later, he rushed for 115 yards and two touchdowns against Nebraska. For the season, he totaled 540 rushing yards on 104 carries (5.2 yards per carry). At the end of the season, he was selected in fan voting as the Fans Choice Canadian NCAA Player of the Year.
With eligibility not impacted by the 2020 season, Brown remained classified as a sophomore in 2021. On October 2, 2021, he rushed for a career-high 257 yards against Charlotte – the fourth-highest single-game rushing total in Illinois history. Three week later, he rushed for 229 yards in the Illini's NCAA-record nine-overtime victory over No. 7 Penn State. His 223 yards was the most ever tallied by an opposing player at Penn State's Beaver Stadium. For the full 2021 season, Brown rushed for 1,005 yards on 170 carries, and his average of 100.5 rushing yards per game ranked second in the Big Ten Conference. Brown was twice named Big Ten Offensive Player of the Week in 2021 and received third-team honors on the 2021 All-Big Ten Conference football team.

In the 2022 season opener against Wyoming, Brown rushed for 151 yards and three touchdowns on 19 carries. He was named Big Ten Offensive Player of the Week after the first week. Against Indiana on September 2, he rushed for 199 yards and was selected as the first winner of the Doak Walker National Running Back of the Week award.  He then rushed for in excess of 100 yards in each of the next five games: 146 yards against Virginia on September 10; 108 yards against Chattanooga on September 22; 129 yards against Wisconsin on October 1; 146 yards against Iowa on October 8; and 180 yards against Minnesota on October 15. His yardage against Minnesota pushed him over the 1,000-yard mark, making him the first player to reach the mark in 2022 and the third Illinois player to rush for over 1,000 yards in consecutive years. Brown finished second nationally with 1,643 rushing yards. He was later awarded the 2022 Jon Cornish Trophy as the top Canadian player in NCAA football.

Statistics

Personal life
Brown is the identical twin brother of safety Sydney Brown. The two were teammates at Illinois.

References

External links
 Illinois Fighting Illini bio

2000 births
American football running backs
American identical twins
Canadian expatriate American football people in the United States
Canadian players of American football
Illinois Fighting Illini football players
Jon Cornish Trophy winners
Living people
Sportspeople from London, Ontario
Western Michigan Broncos football players